Daniel Friedman is an American author of mystery fiction. He lives in New York City.

Works
Friedman is best known for his first novel, Don’t Ever Get Old (2013), introducing the retired Memphis police detective Buck Schatz. The book was nominated for an Edgar Award for Best First Novel, the Anthony Award for Best First Novel, and won the Macavity Award for Best First Novel. A sequel, Don’t Ever Look Back, was published in 2014.

Books

Buck Schatz
Don’t Ever Get Old, St. Martin's Press, 2012 
Don’t Ever Look Back, St. Martin's Press, 2014
Running Out of Road, MacMillan/St. Martin's Press/Minotaur 03/24/2020.

Other books
Riot Most Uncouth: A Lord Byron Mystery, Minotaur Books, 2015

References

American crime fiction writers
American male novelists
21st-century American novelists
Place of birth missing (living people)
Macavity Award winners
Living people
Writers from New York City
Year of birth missing (living people)
21st-century American male writers
Novelists from New York (state)